The 1963–64 British Home Championship international Home Nations football tournament was an unusual affair in which victory was shared between the England, Scotland and Ireland national football teams after all teams scored four points by beating Wales and then winning one and losing one of their remaining matches. Goal difference was not at this stage used to determine team positions in the tournament, but if it had been, England would have won with a goal difference of +8 with Scotland second and Ireland third.

England began the tournament the stronger side, defeating Wales 4–0 in Cardiff. Ireland too began well, beating the fancied Scots in a close game in Belfast. In the second round England took the lead with a thumping 8–3 victory over Ireland at home, in which Jimmy Greaves and Terry Paine both scored hat-tricks. The Scots gained some ground on the leaders by beating Wales in a close game in Glasgow in which John White scored. He was killed just two months after the tournament concluded. In the final matches, played at the close of the domestic season, England needed only a draw against Scotland to claim the trophy, whilst Ireland had to beat Wales to have any hope of reaching parity. Ireland were successful in another close game at Swansea, but Scotland edged England 1–0 to claim their own third share of the Championship.

Table

Results

References

External links
Full Results and Line-ups

1964
1964 in British sport
1963–64 in Northern Ireland association football
1963–64 in English football
1963–64 in Scottish football
1963–64 in Welsh football